Alchornea integrifolia  is a plant species in the family Euphorbiaceae. It is endemic to Guatemala where it has only been found in the departments of Alta Verapaz and Baja Verapaz. It is a tree of 6-25 m that grows in swampy broadleaf forest at an altitude of 1000–1500 m.

References

Alchorneae
Endemic flora of Guatemala
Trees of Guatemala